Mount Thetis is a mountain in the Central Highlands region of Tasmania, Australia. It is part of the Pelion Range and is situated within the Cradle Mountain-Lake St Clair National Park. It is a major feature of the national park, and is a popular venue with bushwalkers and mountain climbers.

See also

 List of highest mountains of Tasmania

References

External links
 Parks Tasmania
 

Thetis
Thetis
Thetis
Mountains of Australia